Gary Zukav (born October 17, 1942) is an American spiritual teacher and the author of four consecutive New York Times Best Sellers. Beginning in 1998, he appeared more than 30 times on The Oprah Winfrey Show to discuss transformation in human consciousness concepts presented in his book The Seat of the Soul. His first book, The Dancing Wu Li Masters (1979), won a U.S. National Book Award.

Life
Gary Zukav was born in Port Arthur, Texas, the elder of two children of Morris Luis "Morey" and Lorene (née Weinberg) Zukav. His father owned a jewelry store in Pittsburg, Kansas, and his mother was a housewife who raised him and his younger sister.  Gary spent his early childhood in San Antonio and Houston. His family moved to Pittsburg, Kansas in 1952, while he was in fourth grade. In 1960, he graduated from Pittsburg High School as valedictorian. During that time he became an Eagle Scout, Governor of Kansas Boy's State, President of the Student Council, and Kansas State Debate championship team member twice.

In 1959, Gary received a scholarship to Harvard and matriculated high school in 1960. In his junior year at Harvard he left to motorcycle in Europe, North Africa, and the Middle East before returning the following year. In 1964, he was deeply moved by the murders of Chaney, Goodman, and Schwerner in Philadelphia, Mississippi, and worked as a summer volunteer for the National Association for the Advancement of Colored People (NAACP) in Jackson, Mississippi, under the direction of Charles Evers, brother of the slain Medgar Evers. In 1965, he graduated from Harvard.  That same year he enlisted in the U.S. Army and entered U.S. Army Infantry Officer Candidate School.  He was made a second lieutenant in 1966. He volunteered for the U.S. Army Special Forces (Green Berets), completed parachute training (Fort Benning, Georgia), and U.S. Army Special Warfare School (Fort Bragg, North Carolina), then served as a detachment executive officer in Okinawa and Vietnam, participating in top secret operations in Vietnam and Laos. He left Vietnam after the Tet Offensive of January 1968 and was discharged from the army in 1968 as a first lieutenant.

Zukav returned to the U.S. in 1970 and moved to San Francisco, California. He recounts this period as an emotionally volatile time of sexual addiction, motorcycles, anger and drug-abuse.  This continued until 1975 when his roommate, Jack Sarfatti, took him to visit the Lawrence Berkeley Laboratory where Zukav became intrigued by quantum physics. He began writing his first book, The Dancing Wu Li Masters, written with extensive help from Jack Sarfatti and other physicists he met through Sarfatti, as described in David Kaiser's book How the Hippies Saved Physics. He later described this book as his "first gift to Life". In 1987 he moved to Mount Shasta, California, where he lived in a cabin as a self-described "secular monk" and spent time in the surrounding wilderness. In 1993 he met and later married Linda Francis. They co-founded the Seat of the Soul Institute in 1998 and moved to Ashland, Oregon, in 2000.

Writing career
Christopher Lehmann-Haupt reviewed The Dancing Wu Li Masters in The New York Times March 28, 1979. 
He called it a book that manages to explain relativity and a lot more without resorting to a single bit of mathematics (except for asking you to grasp the not-too-onerous concept that the velocity of light, a constant 186,000 miles per second, is a product of its frequency and wavelength). After all, Mr. Zukav writes, "The fact is that physics is not mathematics. Physics, in essence, is simple wonder at the way things are and a divine (some call it compulsive) interest in how that is so. Mathematics is the tool of physics, stripped of mathematics, physics becomes pure enchantment."
 
The review also acclaimed Zukav as one of those rare gifted teachers who makes you feel as if you're ahead of the lesson, jumping happily to conclusions he hasn't yet seen (though of course he has). And when he does arrive at those conclusions, he often states them in the words of their original discoverers, which suddenly seem as simple as "Pat the Bunny" and flatter you into thinking you could have understood them in their original context on your own. The drama built into Mr. Zukav's presentation is considerable. It begins with his introduction of an Oriental dimension. The Chinese name for "physics", "wu li", also means (depending upon how it is pronounced) "patterns of organic energy", "my way", "nonsense", "I clutch my ideas" and "enlightenment". These six meanings, not only become the title of the book's six sections – for instance, "Nonsense" is the heading of the one on Einstein's ideas, which is divided into chapters called "Beginner's Mind", "Special Nonsense", and "General Nonsense" – they also serve to shape the leitmotif of Mr. Zukav's discussion that relates modern physics to Oriental religion.

Dancing Wu Li Masters was also reviewed by the scientific community.

Robert H. March, Professor of Physics at the University of Wisconsin, wrote in Physics Today in August 1979, "Dealing with general relativity [Zukav] manages to convey the profound mental shift required to reduce physics to geometry. This is a neat trick, considering that he addresses an audience familiar with neither physics nor non-Euclidian geometry."

Martin Gardner, mathematician and science writer for Scientific American, wrote in a book review: "Zukav is such a skillful expositor, with such an amiable style, that it is hard to imagine a layman who would not find this book enjoyable and informative."

David Bohm, renowned quantum physicist, wrote a personal endorsement provided to the book's publisher Harper Collins: "Recommended highly for those who want to understand the essential significance of modern physics, and for those who are concerned with its implications for possible transformation of human consciousness."

Zukav's next book, The Seat of the Soul, published in 1989, was a No. 1 New York Times Best Seller for 31 weeks and remained on the list for three years. In an interview by Jeffrey Mishlove, for the popular Public Television series Thinking Allowed, Zukav summarized the concepts presented in The Seat of the Soul.

My objective was not to make the soul legitimate in terms of science. The soul is legitimate, period. It doesn't need validation. At least that was my perception and so I wrote The Seat of the Soul to share the things that were most important to me. The Dancing Wu Li Masters was designed to open the mind and The Seat of the Soul, is a book designed to open the heart. And this is often the sequence that many people encounter as they move into an expanded awareness of who they are and why they are here.

Our evolution, until very recently, has been as five sensory humans evolving through the exploration of physical reality. That is the same thing as the pursuit of external power. Now we have crossed the threshold, we're in new territory, a brand new domain. We are now becoming multi sensory. That means we are no longer confined to the five senses. Now I use these terms because the five senses together form a single sensory system and the object of that sensory system is physical reality. That's what it is designed to detect. As we become multi sensory, we move beyond the limitations of the five senses and we now are evolving to a different mechanism in the exploration of physical reality. We are evolving through responsible choice of and with the assistance and guidance of non physical guides and teachers.

We are spiritual beings, we have always been spiritual beings and we will always be spiritual beings. The difference is that now we are becoming aware of ourselves as spiritual beings and that is making all the difference.

In 1998 Zukav began an ongoing conversation with Oprah Winfrey, appearing on her television show 35 times – more than any other guest. Oprah, who keeps a copy of The Seat of the Soul at her bedside, proclaimed: "The Seat of the Soul is my favorite book of all time, except for the Bible." Her favorite quote from The Seat of the Soul: "Every action, thought, and feeling is motivated by an intention, and that intention is a cause that exists as one with an effect.... In this most profound way, we are held responsible for every action, thought, and feeling, which is to say, for our every intention."

Zukav's third book, Soul Stories (2000), provides examples of people creating what he calls "authentic power." Thoughts from the Seat of the Soul: Meditations for Souls in Progress (2001) offered daily quotes for meditation. The principles in The Seat of the Soul were elaborated in The Heart of the Soul: Emotional Awareness (2002), The Mind of the Soul: Responsible Choice (2003) and Self-Empowerment Journal (2003), a journaling workbook co-authored with Zukav's wife, Linda Francis, and intended as a companion volume to The Mind of the Soul. Soul to Soul: Communications from the Heart (2007) addresses questions about love, fear, choice, responsibility, and intuition. Spiritual Partnership: The Journey to Authentic Power (2010) suggests guidelines for individuals engaged in relationship for the purpose of spiritual development.

In 1999 Zukav and Linda Francis co-founded the Seat of the Soul Institute. It offers programs and tools to develop emotional awareness, responsible choice, intuition, trust, and spiritual partnerships. Events and programs include an annual retreat, lectures, and workshops.

Teachings
Zukav introduces the concept of the alignment of personality with soul as the creation of "authentic power". He asserts that a transformation of humanity is underway from a species that is limited to the perceptions of the five senses, evolves by surviving, and survives by pursuing "external power", which he defines as the ability to manipulate and control, into a species that is not limited to the perceptions of the five senses, evolves by growing spiritually, and grows spiritually by creating authentic power. He further asserts that this transformation brings with it the new potential of authentic power and that the pursuit of external power is henceforth counter-productive to our evolution and produces only violence and destruction.

According to Zukav, creating authentic power is a highly personal endeavor that requires the development of emotional awareness, responsible choice, intuition, and trust in the Universe, which he describes as "alive, wise, and compassionate". He asserts that each individual can create authentic power only for himself or herself. He defines intention as a "quality of consciousness that infuses an action", i.e., the reason or motivation for the action, and choice of intention as the "fundamental creative act" that each individual performs continually, whether unconsciously or consciously. Creating authentic power requires consciously choosing intentions that create consequences for which the chooser is willing to assume responsibility (responsible choice), which requires emotional awareness, and which intuition can assist.

Zukav distinguishes the "Old Male" (five-sensory, protector, provider) and the "Old Female" (five-sensory, child bearer, homemaker) who join in marriage in order to enhance probabilities of survival and comfort from the emerging "New Male" (multi sensory, intuitive, emotionally aware) and the "New Female" (multi sensory, capable in all chosen endeavors) who join in a new kind of relationship in order to create authentic power and assist each other in creating authentic power. He calls this relationship "spiritual partnership" and defines it as "partnership between equals for the purpose of spiritual growth". According to Zukav, "spiritual growth now requires relationships of substance and depth" and only spiritual partnerships are able to support all multi sensory individuals (not only couples) in creating authentic power. Zukav posits the "Universal Human" as the ultimate potential of the emerging multi sensory humanity – a human who is "beyond nation, religion, race, sex, and economic status; a Citizen of the Universe whose allegiance is to Life first and all else second".

Publications 
 Universal Human: Creating Authentic Power and the New Consciousness (2021). Atria Books. .
 Spiritual Partnership (2010). New York: Harper One. .
 Soul to Soul (2007) 
 Self-Empowerment Journal: A Companion to The Mind of the Soul: Responsible Choice (2003), co-author Linda Francis. 
 The Mind of the Soul: Responsible Choice (2003), co-author Linda Francis.  – New York Times best seller
 Thoughts from the Heart of the Soul: Meditations for Emotional Awareness (2002), co-author Linda Francis. 
 The Heart of the Soul: Emotional Awareness (2002), co-author Linda Francis.  – New York Times best seller
 Thoughts from the Seat of the Soul (2001) 
 Soul Stories (2000). 
 The Seat of the Soul (1989).  – number 1 New York Times best seller 31 times and staying on that list for close to 3 years
 The Dancing Wu Li Masters: An Overview of the New Physics (1979).  – winner of the American National Book Award for Science
 Una sedia per l'anima,Milano ed Corbaccio,1996

6 million copies of Zukav's books are in print and translations exist in 24 languages.

Honors 
 World Business Academy Pathfinder Award for Contribution to the Ongoing Evolution of Knowledge and Consciousness within the Global Business Community.
 American Journal of Psychotherapy and Albert Einstein College of Medicine Einstein Award in Recognition of Outstanding Contributions to the Psychosocial Growth of Humanity.
 St. Christopher Foundation Christopher Award for "Lighting One Candle Instead of Cursing the Darkness".
 Zukav was honored with the Award for Clear Telling of Deep Wisdom by the New York Open Center in 2001 for his book, Seat of the Soul, and for his co-founding of Genesis: The Foundation for the Universal Human.
 Named to Oprah's SuperSoul100 list of visionaries and influential leaders in 2016.

Notes

References

External links 

 
Interview with Gary Zukav by Jeffrey Mishlove (later than 1989)
Gary Zukav, columnist, profile at The Huffington Post
 Gary Zukav at Library of Congress Authorities — with 24 catalog records
 

1942 births
United States Army personnel of the Vietnam War
Members of the United States Army Special Forces
United States Army officers
Living people
New Thought writers
New Age writers
New Age spiritual leaders
American spiritual writers
American spiritual teachers
Harvard University alumni
Writers from Ashland, Oregon
People from Pittsburg, Kansas
Sonoma State University alumni
National Book Award winners
Nautilus Book Award winners
People from Mount Shasta, California
Quantum mysticism advocates
Military personnel from California
Military personnel from Oregon